Berberis lycium, called the Indian lycium, Indian barberry, or boxthorn barberry, is a species of flowering plant in the family Berberidaceae. It is native to mountain slopes of the northwestern part of the Indian Subcontinent. A widespread species, its fruit, called kasmal, is edible and is eaten fresh, cooked, and preserved.

References

lycium
Flora of Afghanistan
Flora of Pakistan
Flora of West Himalaya
Flora of India (region)
Flora of Nepal
Plants described in 1834